Chamaraja Wodeyar VI (21 April 1603 – 2 May 1637) was the tenth maharaja of the Kingdom of Mysore from 1617 after his grandfather Raja Wodeyar I's death that year until his death in 1637.

Collapse of the Vijayanagara Empire 
During the 20-year reign of Chamaraja Wodeyar VI, the Vijayanagara Empire collapsed drastically, major portions of which were annexed by the Bahamani and Deccan Sultanates. During this period, Chamaraja Wodeyar's kingdom expanded quickly. By the end of his life—and incidentally his reign—he had nearly doubled the kingdom's border. He died in summer on 2 May 1637. His paternal uncle, Raja Wodeyar II, took over after his death.

See also
Wodeyar dynasty

External links
 Mysore Palace and the Wodeyar Dynasty

1603 births
1637 deaths
Kings of Mysore
Chamaraja VI
17th-century Indian monarchs